The River Bourne is a small river in Dorset, England. It flows into the English Channel at Bournemouth, taking its name simply from Middle English bourn or burn, a small stream, and giving it to the town at its mouth.

The stream is fed from a number of sources but there is little documentary evidence and the actual origins of some are unknown. The head of the stream consists of three culverts emerging from below Ringwood Road; it is believed that one drains Canford Heath, one is fed from the Bournemouth and West Hampshire Water works at Francis Avenue in Knighton Heath and the third is supplied by road run-off. The stream is also fed by natural seeps and flushes, and there are 62 documented surface water discharges to the watercourse.

In the upper reaches, the catchment boundaries are approximately defined by Ringwood Road to the west, Wallisdown Road to the north and Ashley Road/Poole Road to the south. In the lower reaches, the catchment width gradually narrows towards the outfall at Bournemouth Pier.

Reaching Bournemouth Town Centre, it flows through public gardens, known as the Upper, Central and Lower Gardens. It goes underground at The Square (which divides the Central Gardens from the Lower Gardens) and again just before it reaches the beach immediately east of Bournemouth Pier, so that its mouth is no longer visible.

References

Rivers of Bournemouth
Rivers of Poole
Rivers of Dorset
Dorset
Bournemouth